Destron may refer to:
 Decepticon or Destron, a faction in Transformers
 Predacon or Destron, a faction from Beast Wars: Transformers
 Destron, a fictional terrorist organization in Kamen Rider V3